Bagley is a town in Guthrie County, Iowa, United States. The population was 233 in the 2020 census, a decline from 354 in 2000 census. It is part of the Des Moines–West Des Moines Metropolitan Statistical Area.

History
Bagley had its start in the year 1881 by the building of the Chicago, Milwaukee & St. Paul railroad through that territory.

Geography
Bagley is located at  (41.846675, −94.428814).

Demographics

2010 census
As of the census of 2010, there were 303 people, 123 households, and 81 families living in the city. The racial makeup of the city was 93.4% White, 1.7% Native American, 0.3% Asian, 2.3% from other races, and 2.3% from two or more races. Hispanic or Latino of any race were 7.3% of the population.

There were 123 households, of which 28.5% had children under the age of 18 living with them, 51.2% were married couples living together, 7.3% had a female householder with no husband present, 7.3% had a male householder with no wife present, and 34.1% were non-families. 29.3% of all households were made up of individuals, and 9.8% had someone living alone who was 65 years of age or older. The average household size was 2.46 and the average family size was 2.99.

The median age in the city was 41.4 years. 25.4% of residents were under the age of 18; 9% were between the ages of 18 and 24; 21.1% were from 25 to 44; 29.5% were from 45 to 64; and 15.2% were 65 years of age or older. The gender makeup of the city was 53.1% male and 46.9% female.

2000 census
As of the census of 2000, there were 354 people, 144 households, and 96 families living in the city. The racial makeup of the city was 96.89% White, 0.28% African American, 2.26% from other races, and 0.56% from two or more races. Hispanic or Latino of any race were 5.93% of the population.

There were 144 households, out of which 29.9% had children under the age of 18 living with them, 51.4% were married couples living together, 9.7% had a female householder with no husband present, and 33.3% were non-families. 30.6% of all households were made up of individuals, and 16.7% had someone living alone who was 65 years of age or older. The average household size was 2.46 and the average family size was 3.01.

In the city, the population was spread out, with 27.1% under the age of 18, 9.6% from 18 to 24, 26.3% from 25 to 44, 19.2% from 45 to 64, and 17.8% who were 65 years of age or older. The median age was 37 years. For every 100 females, there were 87.3 males. For every 100 females age 18 and over, there were 84.3 males.

The median income for a household in the city was $29,219, and the median income for a family was $38,036. Males had a median income of $26,875 versus $16,429 for females. The per capita income for the city was $13,754. About 9.7% of families and 16.1% of the population were below the poverty line, including 14.1% of those under age 18 and 9.8% of those age 65 or over.

Government
Ruth Riley is mayor along with the council members of Deanna Gibson, Ken Beaudet, Jon Shaffer, John Mathews and John Richardson.

Education
Panorama Community School District serves the community. The district formed on July 1, 1989 as a merger of the Panora-Linden and Y-J-B school districts.

Notable people

Jordan Carstens (1981– ) American football player for the NFL's Carolina Panthers

See also 

 Krushchev in Iowa Trail
 Lemonade Ride

References

External links

Cities in Iowa
Cities in Guthrie County, Iowa
Des Moines metropolitan area
1881 establishments in Iowa